1827 Atkinson, provisional designation , is a background asteroid from the central regions of the asteroid belt, approximately 9 kilometers in diameter. It was discovered on 7 September 1962, by IU's Indiana Asteroid Program at Goethe Link Observatory near Brooklyn, Indiana, United States. The asteroid was named after British astronomer Robert d'Escourt Atkinson.

Orbit and classification 

Atkinson is not a member of any known asteroid family. It orbits the Sun in the central main-belt at a distance of 2.2–3.2 AU once every 4 years and 6 months (1,629 days). Its orbit has an eccentricity of 0.18 and an inclination of 5° with respect to the ecliptic.

Physical characteristics 

In the Tholen classification, Atkinson is similar to a dark D-type asteroid, though with an unusual spectrum (DU). This strongly disagrees with the albedo obtained by the Wide-field Infrared Survey Explorer (WISE), which indicates that is rather a stony S-type asteroid.

Rotation period 

As of 2017, no rotational lightcurve of Atkinson has been obtained from photometric observations. The asteroid's rotation period, shape and poles remain unknown.

Diameter and albedo 

According to the survey carried out by the NEOWISE mission of NASA's Wide-field Infrared Survey Explorer, Atkinson measures 8.855 kilometers in diameter and its surface has an albedo of 0.249.

Naming 

This minor planet was named after British astronomer, physicist and inventor, Robert d'Escourt Atkinson (1898–1982), noted for his contributions to fundamental astronomy. Atkinson pioneered in studying nuclear energy-generation in the Sun and stars. The official  was published by the Minor Planet Center on 15 October 1977.

References

External links 
 Asteroid Lightcurve Database (LCDB), query form (info )
 Dictionary of Minor Planet Names, Google books
 Asteroids and comets rotation curves, CdR – Observatoire de Genève, Raoul Behrend
 Discovery Circumstances: Numbered Minor Planets (1)-(5000) – Minor Planet Center
 
 

001827
001827
Named minor planets
001827
19620907